Robert C. Baker (December 29, 1921 – March 13, 2006) was an American inventor and Cornell University professor. He invented the chicken nugget as well as many other poultry-related inventions. Due to his contributions to the poultry sciences, he is a member of the American Poultry Hall of Fame.

Education
A Lansing, New York, native, Baker earned a bachelor's degree from Cornell University in 1943 studying pomology at the university's College of Agriculture. For his graduate work, Baker took his master's degree in marketing at Penn State University and his doctorate at Purdue University. Baker was a member of the Alpha Zeta fraternity.

Career and innovations
Robert Baker travelled the world innovating how people eat and view chicken. He spent his entire academic life at Cornell University (1957–1989) and published some 290 research papers. In 1970 he founded the university's Institute of Food Science and Marketing. Baker was elected a fellow of the Institute of Food Technologists in 1997.

Accredited to him are more than 40 poultry, turkey and cold cut innovations, making him the "George Washington Carver of poultry". In addition to creating the chicken nugget, he is also responsible for a revolutionary way to bind breading to chicken, co-invented the machine responsible for deboning chicken and created the chicken and turkey hot dogs and turkey ham.

McDonald's is often falsely credited with the invention of the chicken nugget. In fact, Baker published his chicken nugget recipe in the Cornell publication Agricultural Economics Research in April 1963, while McDonald's patented its recipe for Chicken McNuggets in 1979 and started selling the product in 1980.

Baker's famous recipe for Cornell Chicken was actually innovated while Baker was at Penn State but never gained appreciation until he joined the faculty of Cornell.

In popular culture
Comedic singers Paul and Storm have a song titled "Nugget Man" on their album Gumbo Pants, which pays tribute to the late inventor and his most popular invention, the Chicken Nugget. The song humorously explores the career of Baker, lists a few of his other inventions, details the formula for Chicken Nuggets, and the impact of this invention.

In the TV series The Wire, three of the street drug dealer characters discuss who may have invented the chicken nugget and what fortune it may have brought him, with D'Angelo Barksdale, the Crew Chief, pointing out that any such person would have been unlikely to have received any great reward but rather the heads of McDonald's were more likely to have been the main beneficiaries.

In the Netflix series Bill Nye Saves the World, Baker is portrayed by actor Michael Ian Black in the angry scientist section of season 3 episode 4.

References

External links

Cornell University obituary
Cornell Sun obituary
The San Diego Union Tribute obituary
Recipe for Baker's famous Cornell Chicken
"Nugget man" Tribute song by Paul and Storm
Baker's invention of the chicken barbecue

1921 births
2006 deaths
American food scientists
Cornell University College of Agriculture and Life Sciences alumni
Smeal College of Business alumni
Purdue University College of Agriculture alumni
Cornell University faculty
Fellows of the Institute of Food Technologists
People from Lansing, New York
20th-century American inventors
Scientists from New York (state)
Pennsylvania State University alumni